Coreopsis intermedia, the goldenwave tickseed, is a North American species of plants in the family Asteraceae. It is native to a small region in the south-central United States (eastern Texas, western Louisiana, southwestern Arkansas.

Coreopsis intermedia is an  annual or short-lived perennial up to 90 cm (3 feet) tall, with yellow flower heads containing both ray florets and disc florets.

References

External links
photo of herbarium specimen at Missouri Botanical Garden, collected in Texas

intermedia
Flora of the Southern United States
Plants described in 1929